Elassoma is a genus of freshwater fish, the only member of subfamily Elassomatinae of the sunfish family Centrarchidae in the order Perciformes. It is sometimes classified as a separate family, the Elassomatidae, in a monotypic suborder, Elassomatoidei, in Perciformes.  The type species is E. zonatum, the banded pygmy sunfish. The Elassomatinae are known collectively as pygmy sunfishes, but are considered by some authorities not to be true sunfishes, which are members of family Centrarchidae. Some researchers believe they are related to sticklebacks and pipefishes (order Syngnathiformes) rather than Perciformes, though genetic research strongly implies a close relationship with the centrarchids. Currently the Integrated Taxonomic Information System classifies them in the family Elassomatidae rather than Centrarchidae. 

They occur mostly in temperate and subtropical swamps, marshes, and other shallow, slow-moving, and heavily vegetated waters, across an area of the American South stretching from the Coastal Plain of North Carolina to central Florida, west along the Gulf Coast to eastern Texas, and north up the Mississippi River Valley to southern Illinois. The bluebarred, Carolina, and spring pygmy sunfishes have small localized populations and are considered Vulnerable.

The pygmy sunfishes are too small to be game fish, but are relatively popular as aquarium fish because of the males' iridescent colors and fascinating breeding behaviors. Eggs are laid on or beneath dense vegetation, and the male guards the nest area until the fry hatch and scatter. They adapt well to small aquaria and are relatively adaptable to a range of conditions, but seldom take conventional prepared fish foods, instead requiring small live worms, insects, or crustaceans as food.

Etymology 
The generic name Elassoma derives from the Greek ελάσσων (elasson) meaning smaller and σώμα (soma) meaning body, in reference to the fishes' diminutive size compared to the typical sunfishes.

Species
The currently recognized species in this genus are:
 Elassoma alabamae Mayden, 1993 (spring pygmy sunfish)
 Elassoma boehlkei Rohde & R. G. Arndt, 1987 (Carolina pygmy sunfish)
 Elassoma evergladei D. S. Jordan, 1884 (Everglades pygmy sunfish)
 Elassoma gilberti Snelson, Krabbenhoft & Quattro, 2009 (Gulf Coast pygmy sunfish)
 Elassoma okatie Rohde & R. G. Arndt, 1987 (bluebarred pygmy sunfish)
 Elassoma okefenokee J. E. Böhlke, 1956 (Okefenokee pygmy sunfish)
 Elassoma zonatum D. S. Jordan, 1877 (banded pygmy sunfish)

See also
 List of fish families

References

Other sources
North American Native Fishes Association (NANFA) Elassoma forum  Pygmy Sunfishes - NANFA Forum
Duzen, Bill. "The Pygmy Sunfish." The Native Fish Conservancy Website.

Elassomatoidei
Centrarchidae
Fauna of the Southeastern United States
Taxa named by David Starr Jordan